The Yugoslav Democratic Party, State Party of Serbian, Croatian and Slovene Democrats and Democratic Party, also known as the Democratic Union was the name of a series of liberal political parties that existed in succession in the State of Slovenes, Croats and Serbs and the Kingdom of Serbs, Croats and Slovenes (later the Kingdom of Yugoslavia).

History

Yugoslav Democratic Party
The Yugoslav Democratic Party was a Slovenian liberal political party, founded in June 1918 from the merge of all three Slovene national liberal parties that had been formed since the 1890s in the Slovene-speaking parts of Austria-Hungary: the National Progressive Party in Carniola, the National Party in Styria, and the National Progressive Party in Gorizia and Gradisca. Prominent members included Ivan Tavčar, Ivan Hribar, Albert Kramar, Gregor Žerjav, and Milko Brezigar.

State Party of Serbian, Croatian and Slovene Democrats
In the Spring of 1919, in Sarajevo, the State Party of Serbian, Croatian and Slovene Democrats (Državnotvorna stranka demokrata Srba, Hrvata i Slovenaca) is created by a merger of the Yugoslav Democratic Party with Serbian and Croatian liberal parties, namely the Independent Radical Party led by Ljubomir Davidović, the fractions of Serbian Progressive Party, the People's Party of Croatia and the Svetozar Pribićević's Croat-Serb Coalition, as well as fractions of Montenegrin People's Party led by Andrija Radović.

The elected president of the party was Ljubomir Davidović, also a president of the Assembly and a mayor of Belgrade.

The party won the largest number of deputies in the first elections held in 1920: they could occupy 92 of the 419 seats in the constituent assembly. From 1 January 1922 on, they participated in the government of Prime Minister Nikola Pašić of the People's Radical Party. Together with the People's Radical Party, the Democrats were the main supporters of the constitution passed on 28 June 1921. Members of the Democratic Party were significantly involved in the foundation of the Organization of Yugoslav Nationalists (ORJUNA) in 1921. In the 1923 elections, the party's number of deputies in the National Assembly dropped to 51. In May 1924, the Democrats joined the Oppositional Bloc against the Pašić government, appealing for a democratic Yugoslavia and calling for a fair share in the government for Croatians and Slovenes.

Democratic Party
In early 1924, Prime Minister Pašić succeeded in winning the support of some Democratic deputies around Svetozar Pribićević, to reject especially the Croatian demands for more influence. Therefore, the conflict between Pribićević and party leader Ljubomir Davidović heatened. While Pribićević intransigently persisted on the principle of the unitary Yugoslavia, Davidović favoured moderation and concessions considering the Croatian demands. Hence, Pribićević and fourteen fellow lawmakers left the Democratic Party and founded the Independent Democratic Party, which readily joined a "National Bloc" coalition with the Radical Party of Prime Minister Pašić.

The Slovenian, Croatian, Croatian Serb and Bosnian sections, led by Svetozar Pribićević, moved to the latter. The Democratic Party thus shrunk mostly to Serbia, Macedonia, and Montenegro, while in the former Austro-Hungarian areas of the state, the Independent Democratic Party prevailed.

The Democratic Party was in and out of government, either independently or as part of a coalition, until 1929 when King Alexander abolished the Vidovdan Constitution and created a personal dictatorship, changing the name of the country to Kingdom of Yugoslavia. The Democratic Party remained in opposition until World War II.

After Davidović's death in 1940, Milan Grol took over the presidency of the party.

During the invasion of Yugoslavia by Nazi Germany in 1941, Grol and most of the party leadership fled to the United Kingdom. After the war, the Democratic Party called for a boycott of communist-organized elections in 1945. The Communist Party (KPJ) led by Josip Broz Tito banned the Democratic Party in 1946.

Electoral performances

See also
Democratic Party (Serbia)

References

Banned political parties
Political parties established in 1919
Political parties disestablished in 1948
Liberal parties in Slovenia
Political history of Slovenia
Defunct liberal political parties
Political parties in the Kingdom of Yugoslavia
Liberalism in Yugoslavia
Yugoslavism